Victor Gonzalez Jr. (born July 18, 1975) is a Puerto Rican professional stock car racing driver. He last competed part-time in the NASCAR Xfinity Series, driving the No. 17 Chevrolet Camaro for Niece Motorsports. Twice a competitor in the 24 Hours of Daytona endurance race, he became the first Puerto Rican driver to compete in a top level NASCAR series when he broke the barrier in 2009.

Racing career

Gonzalez began his racing career in 1990 in showroom stock cars in his native Puerto Rico; he spent several years competing in touring cars, including two races in the North American Touring Car Championship, before switching to open wheel competition in 1997, competing in the Barber Dodge Pro Series for two years, then, after two years in the Dominican Republic GTS Cup, moving to the Toyota Atlantic Championship in 2002, where he competed in the series' companion event to the Grand Prix of Long Beach, finishing 21st; in 2003 he returned to the Barber Dodge series, where he finished 20th in points, posting a best finish of 2nd following winning the pole at The Milwaukee Mile. He established a reputation as an excellent driver on road courses, and became the only Puerto Rican driver to become an instructor at the Skip Barber Racing School.

In 2005 and 2006, Gonzalez competed in the 24 Hours of Daytona endurance race, co-driving a Porsche 911 for Team Sahlen. He finished 9th in both events.

Gonzalez made his debut in NASCAR competition in 2009, as a road course ringer at Circuit Gilles Villeneuve in the Nationwide Series NAPA Auto Parts 200, driving the No. 05 Ford for Day Enterprises. He became the first Puerto Rican driver to compete in a NASCAR national touring series event, finishing 14th in his inaugural event.

Gonzalez returned to the No. 05 for four races in 2010, making his oval track debut at Phoenix International Raceway; his best finish of the year came at Montreal where he finished 16th.

In 2012, Gonzalez returned to the Nationwide Series, driving the No. 99 Toyota for RAB Racing at Road America in June, where he finished 17th, and at Watkins Glen International in August, where he finished 16th.

In April 2013, it was announced that Gonzalez would make his NASCAR Sprint Cup Series debut, driving the No. 36 Chevrolet for Tommy Baldwin Racing in races at Sonoma Raceway and Watkins Glen International that summer. He was the first Puerto Rican driver to start a Sprint Cup race.

Gonzalez and Niece Motorsports made an agreement in June 2017 to have Gonzalez drive Niece's No. 45 truck at Canadian Tire Motorsport Park that summer.

Motorsports career results

Barber Dodge Pro Series

NASCAR
(key) (Bold – Pole position awarded by qualifying time. Italics – Pole position earned by points standings or practice time. * – Most laps led.)

Sprint Cup Series

Xfinity Series

Camping World Truck Series

 Season still in progress
 not eligible for series points

North American Touring Car Championship
(key)

References

External links
 
 

Living people
1975 births
Sportspeople from San Juan, Puerto Rico
Puerto Rican racing drivers
24 Hours of Daytona drivers
NASCAR drivers
Atlantic Championship drivers
Barber Pro Series drivers
Global RallyCross Championship drivers
Michelin Pilot Challenge drivers
North American Touring Car Championship drivers